Asnières-sur-Saône (literally "Asnières on Saône") is a commune in the Ain department in the Auvergne-Rhône-Alpes region of eastern France.

Geography
Asnières-sur-Saône is on the bank of the Saône river some 15 km north of Mâcon and 50 km south of Chalons-sur-Saône. The commune can be accessed on the D18 road from Quart-d'Aval in the north-east to the village.  The road continues south as the D1 road then turns south-east to Manziat.  The D1E branches off in the south of the commune and goes south to Le Chateau. The commune consists entirely of farmland with no other villages or hamlets.

The Saône river forms the entire western border of the commune with no bridges across the river. A canal runs parallel to the river joining the river in the south and joining the Bief de la Jutane in the north which forms part of the northern border.

History
The village can be traced back to the 10th century under the name Asnerias. It was the possession of the Counts of Mâcon and Cluny Abbey.

Administration

Mayors of Asnières-sur-Saône

Twinning

Asnières-sur-Saône has twinning associations with:
 Bad Waldsee (Germany) since 1991.

Population

Sights
The Port of Asnières

Protected natural areas
The floodplains of the Val de Saône have been classified as protected areas since 1994.

Personalities
José Mingret (1880-1969), French painter, was buried in Asnieres-sur-Saône.

See also
Communes of the Ain department

External links
Asnières-sur-Saône on Géoportail, National Geographic Institute (IGN) website 
Asnieres on the 1750 Cassini Map

References

Communes of Ain